The Jerome County Courthouse is a building located in Jerome, Idaho, United States that was listed on the National Register of Historic Places in 1987.

See also

 National Register of Historic Places listings in Jerome County, Idaho
 List of National Historic Landmarks in Idaho

References

1938 establishments in Idaho
Art Deco architecture in Idaho
Buildings and structures in Jerome County, Idaho
Courthouses on the National Register of Historic Places in Idaho
Government buildings completed in 1938
National Register of Historic Places in Jerome County, Idaho